Accubitum  (plural: accubita) was one name for the ancient Roman furniture couches used in the time of the Roman emperors, in the triclinium or dining room, for reclining upon at meals.  It was also apparently sometimes the name of the dining room itself, or a niche for a couch. Sometimes it denotes a multi-person curved couch, for which the term stibadium is also used.  Klinai is the Greek equivalent, sometimes also used. Oftentimes, the Romans would guild these couches with silver or bronze.

The mattresses and feather-beds were softer and higher, and the supports (fulcra) of them lower in proportion, than in older triclinium couches. The cloths and pillows spread over them, and over beds, were called accubitalia.

Notes

References

Couches
Ancient Roman culture
Ancient Roman furniture